The Rhode Island Convention Center is an exposition center in downtown Providence, RI. It is connected by skybridges to the Amica Mutual Pavilion, and the adjacent Omni Hotels Omni Providence Hotel (formerly The Westin). The ground level features a main exhibition hall with 100,000 square feet, and the upper level has a ballroom and meeting halls. The building has a five-story glass front with a large space outside the meeting rooms and exhibit halls where visitors can gather and mingle. The center is operated by the Rhode Island Convention Center Authority, which also operates the Amica Mutual Pavilion and Veterans Memorial Auditorium.

History

Background
As far back as 1958, plans had been put forward to build a convention center. A 1970 planning document had included a civic and convention center, but when the Civic Center was built in 1973, convention and exhibition space was not included for cost reasons. The idea was revived in the late 1980s, and a Convention Center Authority was established in 1987 to look into the feasibility of building a convention center along with hotel and parking garage. In 1991, Governor Bruce Sundlun put his full support into the project, making it the centerpiece of a large state-funded  construction project to revitalize Providence's downtown. His plan also included relocating the railroad, and building Waterplace Park and walkways along the city's rivers. Sundlun argued that a convention center would attract tourists and become an economic engine for the state.

Construction
The Convention Center Authority purchased the Bonanza Bus Station and two parking lots to provide land. The bus station was demolished to make room for the Convention Center.

Construction on the Center proceeded rapidly, despite the land being unstable; the site had been the location of the Great Salt Cove, which meant that pilings had to be driven deeper than originally anticipated. Despite this, the project opened on schedule. The north parking garage finished January 1993; the Convention Center and south garage were completed November 1993. The center held its ribbon cutting ceremony on November 24, 1993.  

The adjacent Westin Hotel (now Omni Providence Hotel) was completed in December 1994.

21st Century
In 2017, the Convention Center hosted 242 events.  It made an operating profit of $800,000, which is an unusually high revenue for a convention center.  However, as of 2018 the state still pays $15 million per year to pay off the initial construction bonds.  The Center is operated by the Rhode Island Convention Center Authority, which also operates the Dunkin’ Donuts Center and Veterans Memorial Auditorium.

COVID-19 pandemic
The COVID-19 pandemic of 2020-2021 resulted in the cancellation of most of the shows and concerts normally hosted by the convention center, including the Rhode Island Comic Con (a major draw). The state of Rhode Island paid to rent the facility for emergency measures; the main exhibition space was utilized for a COVID field hospital, and the garages became the home for a testing laboratory and drive-through testing site. This role enabled the center to remain profitable despite the decline in normal programming.

Proposed Name Change 
On June 30, 2022, the naming rights to the Dunkin' Donuts Center officially expired after 21 years. On September 6, 2022, it was announced that Lincoln, Rhode Island based Amica Mutual Insurance purchased the naming rights, opting to rename the arena to the Amica Mutual Pavilion. Although Amica was also awarded the rights to rename the convention center as part of the new deal, the company ultimately chose to keep the facility's current name.

Events
The Convention Center hosts nearly 250 events each year. Examples include the Rhode Island Comic Con, dance competitions, and trade shows such as the Northeastern Retail Lumber Association Expo, the New England Regional Turfgrass Foundation, the Providence Boat Show, the Baby Show, and the Business Expo.

See also
Amica Mutual Pavilion

References

External links
 

Buildings and structures in Providence, Rhode Island
Convention centers in the United States
Event venues in Rhode Island
Tourist attractions in Providence, Rhode Island